Muduuma is a town in central Uganda. It is one of the urban centers in Mpigi District.

Location
The coordinates of Muduuma are: 0°20'48.0"N, 32°18'28.0"E (Latitude:0.346680; Longitude:32.307766).

Overview
Muduuma is a small urban center, surrounded by a rural agricultural community.

Points of interest
The following points of interest lie within the town limits or close to the edges of town:

 The offices of Muduuma Town Council
 Muduuma Central Market
 Muduuma Health Centre III
 Headquarters of Muduuma sub-county

References

Populated places in Central Region, Uganda
Cities in the Great Rift Valley
Mpigi District